Brian Coleman (21 May 1932 – 9 December 1966) was an Australian rules footballer who played with Essendon in the Victorian Football League (VFL).

Coleman, a half back, started his career at Cobden. From there he joined Essendon and played five games in both the 1952 and 1953 VFL seasons. He left Essendon in 1954 and returned to the Ballarat Football League, signing with Maryborough. In 1961 he won the league's best and fairest award.

He died in 1966, aged 34, in an accident at a gymnasium. A police constable, he had attempted a somersault from a spring board and received cervical injuries when he landed badly. He died on the way to the hospital.

References

1932 births
Essendon Football Club players
Cobden Football Club players
Maryborough Football Club players
Australian police officers
Accidental deaths in Victoria (Australia)
1966 deaths
Australian rules footballers from Melbourne
Place of birth missing